Brian Molloy (born 9 September 1995) is an Irish hurler who plays as a right corner-forward for the Galway senior team.

Born in Leitrim, County Galway, Molloy first played competitive hurling during his schooling at St. Brigid's Vocational School. He arrived on the inter-county scene at the age of fifteen when he first linked up with the Galway minor team before later joining the under-21 and intermediate sides. He made his senior debut during the 2015 Walsh Cup.

At club level Molloy is a one-time Connacht medallist in the intermediate grade with Kilnadeema–Leitrim. He has also won one championship medal in the same grade.

Honours
Kilnadeema–Leitrim
Connacht Intermediate Club Hurling Championship (1): 2013
Galway Intermediate Hurling Championship (1): 2013

Galway
Walsh Cup (1): 2015
Leinster Intermediate Hurling Championship (1): 2015

Maynooth University
Kehoe Cup (1): 2017

References

1995 births
Living people
Kilnadeema-Leitrim hurlers
Galway inter-county hurlers